Panayiotis Panayiotou (born 27 September 1988 in Nicosia, Cyprus) is a Cypriot professional footballer who plays as a full-back for MEAP Nisou in the Cypriot Second Division.

Previously he played for Digenis Morphou on loan from APOEL. He has been elected through the Academies of APOEL. He played in Cyprus national under-21 football team. He had been the top scorer of U-21 championship of Cyprus with APOEL in season 2006-2007. Still one talented young man that is considered a future hope.

External links
 Panayiotis Panayiotou at apoel.fc
 

1988 births
Living people
Association football defenders
Greek Cypriot people
Cypriot footballers
Cyprus under-21 international footballers
APOEL FC players
Digenis Akritas Morphou FC players
Olympiakos Nicosia players
Chalkanoras Idaliou players
PAEEK players
Othellos Athienou F.C. players
MEAP Nisou players
Cypriot First Division players
Cypriot Second Division players